Jenny Johnson may refer to:
Jenny Johnson (field hockey) (born 1979), Canadian field hockey player
Jenny Johnson (poet), American poet
Jenny Johnson Jordan (born 1973), American beach volleyball player

See also
Jennifer Johnson (disambiguation)
Jennifer Johnston (disambiguation)